The Heartland Conference men's basketball tournament was the annual event that concluded the men's basketball season of the Heartland Conference, an NCAA Division II league that began play in 1999 and disbanded after the 2018–19 school year. The tournament, first held in 2003 and continuing through the conference's final basketball season of 2018–19, was a single-elimination tournament, with seeding based on regular-season records.

The winner, declared conference champion, received the Heartland's automatic bid to the NCAA Division II men's basketball tournament.

Following the 2018–19 school year, seven of the nine Heartland members joined the Lone Star Conference, with the other two joining the Mid-America Intercollegiate Athletics Association.

Tournament format
From its establishment in 2003, the Heartland Conference tournament typically featured a simple four-team single-elimination tournament featuring the top four teams from the conference regular season standings. An additional opening round game, featuring the fourth and fifth best teams, was played only in 2006 and 2012. In 2010, two opening round games were played, with the third-seed playing the sixth-seed and the fourth-seed playing the fifth-seed. 

In most years, the tournament was held in a gymnasium on the campus of one of the Heartland Conference member schools. The only exceptions were the 2007 and 2008 tournaments, played in the home arena of North Texas from Division I.

Results

Championship appearances by school

 Among the nine final members of the Heartland Conference, Lubbock Christian, Newman, and Rogers State never reached the tournament final.
 Among teams that left before the league's final 2018–19 season, Lincoln (MO), McMurry, Oklahoma Panhandle State,  and Western New Mexico never reached the finals of the Heartland Conference tournament before departing the league.
 Schools highlighted in red left the Heartland Conference prior to its final 2018–19 season.

References

NCAA Division II men's basketball conference tournaments
Tournament
Recurring sporting events established in 2003
Recurring sporting events disestablished in 2019